Juanita du Plessis (née Naudé; born April 26) is a Namibian Afrikaans country singer. She became known for her song Ska-Rumba. Du Plessis' singing career began in 1998 with her debut album Juanita. That year she won the CMA (Country Music Association in Namibia) awards as best singer, best songwriter and the Association's Award for outstanding achievement.

Her record sales total over 3,000,000. In 2010 she received a South African Music award in the category Best Afrikaans DVD for her 10 Year Hit Celebration Production. The DVD contains her most successful hits over the first 10 years of her singing career. She was also crowned the most popular female artist for the seventh consecutive year at the Huisgenoot's Tempo Awards ceremony in Johannesburg during 2011. In 2018 she celebrated 20 years in the music industry, releasing a greatest hits album 20 Jaar – Treffers van 2008–2018.
Biggest Seller up to date: Vlieg hoog gospel album vol.2 - Juanita du Plessis. 190,000 units sold, going platinum.

Albums 
 Young Hearts (platinum)
 Ek en Jy (Ska-rumba) (3× platinum)
 Dis waar ek wil wees (2× platinum)
 Jy is... (3 x platinum)
 Altyd Daar (3× platinum)
 Bly by my (2× platinum)
 Jou Skaduwee (2× platinum)
 Vlieg Hoog (5× platinum)
 Volmaakte Kring (3× platinum)
 Bring jou Hart, duet with Theuns Jordaan (3× platinum)
 10 Jaar Platinum Treffers (4× platinum)
 Engel van my hart (4× platinum)
 Wees Lig (3× platinum) (SA No. 1)
 Hart vol Drome, duet with Theuns Jordaan (Platinum)
 Jy Voltooi My (2× Platinum) (SA No. 3)
 Nashville (Platinum) (SA No. 15)
 Toe Staan Die Wêreld Stil (Platinum) (SA No. 7)
 Koningskind (Platinum) (SA No. 7)
  Kaalvoetkinners (Juanita du Plessis, Franja du Plessis & Ruan Josh) Goud
 20 Jaar – Treffers van 2008–2018
  Dis Tyd (SA No. 1) Goud
  Sing country  (Juanita du Plessis, Franja du Plessis, Ruan Josh)

Several albums are in Afrikaans and the titles of these are kept in the original language.

DVDs 
 Juanita Op haar Beste (direct, 4× platinum)
 Altyd daar DVD (2× platinum)
 Bring jou hart, duet with Theuns Jordaan (5× platinum)
 10 Jaar Platinum Treffers DVD (3× platinum)
 Tydloos... Die Musiekvideo's (platinum)
 Hart vol Drome, duet with Theuns Jordaan (2× platinum)
 Tydloos 2 (Die Musiekvideo's)

Personal life
Du Plessis was born on April 26 in Windhoek, South West Africa (present-day Namibia).  She and her husband Doepie have three children: Ruan (son) and twins Mario (son) and Franja (daughter). Franja is also an Afrikaans singer.

Notes

References

External links 
 https://web.archive.org/web/20150220201542/http://www.juanitaduplessis.com/ (Afrikaans)
 https://web.archive.org/web/20131121062227/http://vetseun.co.za/anarkans/bladsy/juanita.htm

20th-century Namibian women singers
20th-century South African women singers
21st-century Namibian women singers
21st-century South African women singers
Afrikaans-language singers
Living people
Namibian Afrikaner people
Namibian expatriates in South Africa
Namibian people of South African descent
Musicians from Windhoek
White Namibian people
Year of birth missing (living people)